The Wachs Arena is an 8,057 seat multi-purpose arena in Aberdeen, South Dakota. 
The Wachs Arena is home to the Don Meyer Court, named after long-time winning coach Don Meyer. The Arena is located in the Barnett Center; which holds swimming pool, wrestling room, weight room, training room, auxiliary gym, eight locker rooms, classrooms and offices. A 160-meter indoor track and a wooden basketball courts. It was the Home of a Presidential visit to the Area by President George W. Bush October 31, 2002

References

Indoor arenas in South Dakota
College basketball venues in the United States
Sports venues in South Dakota
Buildings and structures in Aberdeen, South Dakota
1987 establishments in South Dakota
Sports venues completed in 1987
Basketball venues in South Dakota
College volleyball venues in the United States
Northern State Wolves basketball